Two ships have been named Spirit of Discovery:

, a cruise ship of Cruise West
, a cruise ship launched in 2019 for Saga Cruises

Ship names